The Croatian Hockey League Season for 1998-1999 resulted with KHL Medveščak winning the title for the third time in a row.

Teams
 KHL Mladost
 KHL Medveščak Zagreb
 KHL Zagreb
 HK Ina Sisak

Regular season

Playoffs

Semifinals
The semifinals on 13 and 16 February. 
Medvescak beat Sisak 2–0 in a best of three series. (14–5) and (5–0)
Zagreb beat Mladost 2–1 in a best of three series. (2–5), (6–4) and (4–1)

Finals
Medvescak swept Zagreb in a best of five series, by 3–0. 
Medvescak – KHL Zagreb (8–4) (3–1) (5–4)

Third place
Sisak forfeited its games to Mladost, so Mladost won third place by default.

Croatian Ice Hockey League
1
Croatian Ice Hockey League seasons